Samaru is a town and ward in Sabon Gari Local Government of Kaduna state, Nigeria.  The town is a semi-urban area in which Ahmadu Bello University main campus is located. Samaru is one of the most popular town in Zaria with different ethnic groups living together in peace and harmony. Samaru is home for all tribe.

Geography of Samaru 
Samaru is located on latitude 110' 25'N and Longitude 40' 26'E with two basic seasons, which are dry season and the rainy season. The seasons of Samaru enable farmers to produce good farm products at the end of every season.

History 

Samaru is under Zaria emirate but came into full existence in 1924, when Institute for Agriculture Research and training center was established at Samaru.

Educational Institutions in Samaru 
Ahmadu Bello University, Samaru.

Division of Agricultural Science, Samaru

Institute of Agricultural Research, Samaru.

Nigerian Institute of Leather and Science Technology Samaru,  Zaria

Iya abubakar computer samaru zaria.

Ahmadu Bello University Distance Learning

References 

Populated places in Kaduna State